Thatcherina diazi is a species of sea snail, a marine gastropod mollusk in the family Raphitomidae.

Description

Distribution

References

External links

Raphitomidae
Gastropods described in 2004